Blumer's shelf, or the rectal shelf, is a finding palpable (felt) in rectal or vaginal examination that indicates that a tumor has metastasized to the pouch of Douglas. 

It is usually a site of metastasis of cancers of the lung, pancreas and stomach, due to metastatic tumor cells gravitating from an abdominal cancer and growing in the rectovesical or rectouterine pouch.

References

Bibliography
 Blumer, G. (1909). "Rectal shelf: neglected rectal sign of value in diagnosis of obscure malignant and inflammatory disease within the abdomen." Albany Medical Annals. 30:361.

Gastrointestinal cancer